Didac Ángel Devesa Albis (born 30 December 1990) is a Spanish professional footballer who plays as a midfielder for Cypriot club Onisilos Sotira 2014.

Club career
Devesa was born in Esporles, Mallorca. He played youth football with local RCD Mallorca, going on to spend three full seasons as a senior with the reserves in the Segunda División B, the first being 2009–10.

In late April 2012, Devesa was loaned to SD Ponferradina for two seasons, with the deal being made effective in the summer. He made his Segunda División debut on 1 September, starting in a 1–0 away defeat against Girona FC.

On 1 July 2013, Devesa was released by Mallorca. Later in the month, he signed with Lleida Esportiu of the third level.

Devesa terminated his contract on 5 January 2015, joining Football League Greece side Aiginiakos F.C. two weeks later. In the following years he alternated between the country's second tier and the Super League, representing Platanias F.C. and Apollon Smyrnis FC.

On 12 July 2019, Devesa signed with FC Politehnica Iași of the Romanian Liga I. The following transfer window, he returned to the club he had come from, Ermis Aradippou FC.

References

External links

1990 births
Living people
Spanish footballers
Footballers from Mallorca
Association football midfielders
Segunda División players
Segunda División B players
RCD Mallorca B players
SD Ponferradina players
Lleida Esportiu footballers
Super League Greece players
Football League (Greece) players
Platanias F.C. players
Apollon Smyrnis F.C. players
Cypriot First Division players
Cypriot Second Division players
Ermis Aradippou FC players
Onisilos Sotira players
Liga I players
FC Politehnica Iași (2010) players
Futuro Kings FC players
Spanish expatriate footballers
Expatriate footballers in Greece
Expatriate footballers in Cyprus
Expatriate footballers in Romania
Expatriate footballers in Equatorial Guinea
Spanish expatriate sportspeople in Greece
Spanish expatriate sportspeople in Cyprus
Spanish expatriate sportspeople in Romania
Spanish expatriate sportspeople in Equatorial Guinea